State Highway 76, abbreviated as SH-76, is a highway maintained by the U.S. state of Oklahoma. It runs north–south through central Oklahoma, beginning at Jimtown Road just north of the Red River and ending north of Newcastle at SH-37. It has no lettered spur routes.

Route description
SH-76 begins north of the Texas border in Love County, south of Leon. After passing through that town, it has its first highway intersection, with State Highway 32. It continues northward from there for 15 miles (24.1 km) to Wilson. SH-76 runs along that town's main street, while SH-70A provides an eastern bypass. West of Wilson, SH-76 has a two-mile (3 km) concurrency with US-70, after which it splits off and runs through Healdton. It then has a three-mile (5 km) concurrency with SH-53 and then meets SH-7 at Ratliff City.

Four miles north of Ratliff City, SH-76 overlaps for five miles (8 km) with SH-29, before splitting off to the north to SH-19, which it overlaps with through Lindsay. Fifteen miles north of here, it has a four-way-stop controlled intersection with SH-39 west of Dibble. It continues north from there to have a brief concurrency with US-62/277 through Blanchard. SH-76 then has an interchange with the H.E. Bailey Turnpike Spur, and then meets the western terminus of State Highway 130 west of Newcastle. It then passes under Interstate 44 (but does not have an interchange with it) and ends at SH-37.

History
SH-76 first appeared on the 1932 state highway map, originally running from US-70 south of Healdton to SH-22 (now SH-7) at Ratliff City. Between May 1936 and April 1937, the highway was extended northward, all the way to the intersection with US-62/277 southwest of Blanchard. In 1947 or 1948, the route was extended southward through Wilson to end at the Carter/Love county line. SH-76 was extended further south in 1955 or 1956, bringing to SH-32; by 1957 it had its current southern terminus. By 1957 had also been extended northward to its present northern terminus at SH-37.

Junction list

References

External links
SH-76 at OKHighways

076
Transportation in Love County, Oklahoma
Transportation in Carter County, Oklahoma
Transportation in Garvin County, Oklahoma
Transportation in Stephens County, Oklahoma
Transportation in McClain County, Oklahoma